H. Marshall Jarrett (born 1945) was appointed the chief counsel and director of the Office of Professional Responsibility (OPR) of the United States Department of Justice (DOJ) in 1998 and subsequently rose to director for the Executive Office for U.S. Attorneys (EOUSA), from which he retired in 2014.

Quoting the DOJ announcement of Jarrett's appointment as chief counsel,

Jarrett sought to investigate DOJ approval for the National Security Agency's domestic wiretapping program in 2006, but requisite security clearances were denied.  On February 22, 2008, Jarrett announced an investigation of DOJ legal memoranda by John Yoo, Jay Bybee, Steven G. Bradbury, and others justifying waterboarding and other harsh interrogation techniques.

On February 19, 2010, Associate Deputy Attorney General David Margolis issued a memorandum for the attorney general in which he refused both to adopt the OPR's findings of misconduct and to authorize the OPR to recommend to state bar authorities disciplinary actions against Yoo and Bybee.

Jarrett retired his directorship at EOUSA on 31 March 2014.

References

United States Department of Justice lawyers
1945 births
Living people